MacGillivray is a surname and given name derived from the Gaelic language. The name can be written in modern Scottish Gaelic as Bràigheach, MacGille, MacGilleBhràth, and MacIlleBhràth. MacGillivray may refer to:

People 
Given name:
MacGillivray Milne (1882–1959), 27th Governor of American Samoa

Surname:
Carolina Henriette MacGillavry(1904–1993), Dutch chemist
Charles Andrew MacGillivary (1917–2000), Canadian-born American soldier
Helen MacGillivray, Australian statistician
James Pittendrigh MacGillivray (1856–1938), Scottish sculptor and poet
John MacGillivray (1821–1867), Scottish naturalist active in Australia
Ivor MacGillivray (1840–1939), Australian politician 
Paul MacGillivray (1834–1895), Scottish surgeon and naturalist, active in Australia
William MacGillivray (1796–1852), Scottish naturalist
William D. MacGillivray (born 1946), Canadian film director and screenwriter
Allister MacGillivray (born 1948), Canadian composer, guitarist, author

Places
MacGillivray, South Australia, a locality on Kangaroo Island, Australia
McGillivray, British Columbia, an unincorporated community in Canada

Other
MacGillivray Freeman Films, a film studio based in Laguna Beach, CA

Other uses
MacGillivray's warbler (Oporornis tolmiei), a bird species 
Clan Macgillivray, a Scottish clan